Chyka Keebaugh (née Siney) (born 15 December 1968) is an Australian businesswoman, author, media and television personality. Keebaugh spent four years as the homemaking and styling expert on Good Morning Australia, and three series on The Real Housewives of Melbourne.

Early life
Keebaugh was born in Melbourne, Australia and is the daughter of businessman Bruce Siney. She studied hospitality and gastronomy at Le Cordon Bleu in London and floristry at Constance Spry Floristry School.

Career
In 2014 Keebaugh was cast in the Australian reality TV series The Real Housewives of Melbourne on Arena and Bravo. Fellow cast members included Jackie Gillies and Gina Liano. Keebaugh left the show in 2016 after three seasons.

References 

1968 births
Living people
Australian television presenters
Participants in Australian reality television series
The Real Housewives cast members
Australian women television presenters
Australian women writers
The Real Housewives of Melbourne